José Marroquín (born 31 May 1943) is a Guatemalan former sports shooter. He competed in the 300 metre rifle event at the 1968 Summer Olympics.

References

1943 births
Living people
Guatemalan male sport shooters
Olympic shooters of Guatemala
Shooters at the 1968 Summer Olympics
Sportspeople from Guatemala City